XWD, an acronym for Cross-Wheel Drive, is an all-wheel drive system designed by Haldex in partnership with Saab. The XWD, also known as Haldex Generation 4, is an intelligent permanent all-wheel drive system, that can pre-emptively and continuously change torque distribution before wheel slip occurs.

To achieve optimum take-off performance, XWD can completely lock the front and rear axles, adapting as little as 4% of torque to the rear wheels during highway cruising — maximizing fuel economy. To ensure immediate traction, torque distribution can be transferred to the wheel with the most grip in fractions of a second. Using the two couplings, the XWD system can send 85% of its available torque to a single rear wheel. The ability to transfer torque laterally between the rear wheels is similar to Mitsubishi's Super Active Yaw Control.

An ECU continuously collects various data from the car's onboard systems, and in conjunction with the ESC, ABS and TCS, calculates the best torque distribution in the driveline.

The XWD system debuted on the 2008 limited edition Saab Turbo X, equipped with an electronically controlled limited-slip differential (ELSD) and was gradually made available through the rest of the 9-3 line (in sedan and combi body styles). The XWD was the standard powertrain for the Saab 9-5 from 2010 to 2012, underpinning the 2011 Saab 9-4X and was part of the Saab 9-3X, the XUV - crossover introduced by Saab in 2009 based on the 9-3 Sport Combi. The XWD system was also later used in the Opel Insignia.

While the Haldex Generation 4 system was made available to other automobile manufacturers starting in 2009, the XWD moniker was a trademark owned by Saab Automobile AB, and thus cannot be used by any other maker. As of the bankruptcy of Saab Automobile AB in 2011, the XWD name will no longer be used in any production vehicle.

References 

X
XWD
Four-wheel drive layout